HD 7924 is a single star located 55.5 light years away from the Sun in the northern constellation of Cassiopeia, near the northern constellation border with Cepheus. It has an orange hue and is only visible by means of binoculars or a telescope due to a low apparent visual magnitude of 7.167. The star is drifting closer to the Sun with a radial velocity of –22.7 km/s, and is expected to approach to within  in around 711,700 years.

This is a K-type main-sequence star with a stellar classification of K0.5V. Low-level chromospheric activity has been detected, with the star showing spots and an activity cycle. The star is about three billion years old and is spinning with a projected rotational velocity of just 0.9 km/s. It has 81% of the mass of the Sun and 74% of the Sun's radius. The metal content is about seven-tenths as much as the Sun. It is radiating 36.4% of the luminosity of the Sun from its photosphere at an effective temperature of 5,216 K.

Planetary system
In 2009, a super-Earth exoplanet was found in orbit around the star. In 2015, two more planets were discovered, and the mass of the original planet was revised downwards slightly. It is possible that planets c and d are in the 8:5 mean motion resonance. All of the planets lie inside the star's habitable zone.

See also
 List of extrasolar planets

References

K-type main-sequence stars
Planetary systems with three confirmed planets
Cassiopeia (constellation)
BD+75 0058
0056.5
007924
006379
J01215911+7642372